Narrow-ridged finless porpoise may refer to one of two species in the genus Neophocaena:
 the East Asian finless porpoise (N. sunameri)
 the Yangtze finless porpoise (N. asiaeorientalis)

Animal common name disambiguation pages